The Collegiate church of St Mary Magdalene (Spanish: Colegiata de Santa María Magdalena) is a 17th-century building in Cangas del Narcea, Asturias, Spain.

See also
Asturian art
Catholic Church in Spain

References

Churches in Asturias
Collegiate churches in Spain
Roman Catholic churches in Spain
Bien de Interés Cultural landmarks in Asturias